Glandularia chiricahensis is a species of flowering plant in the family Verbenaceae with the common name Chiricahua Mountain mock vervain or Chiricahua vervain. The specific name is sometimes misspelled as "chiricahuensis".

Description
Glandularia chiricahensis is a perennial herb that grows up to 30 inches tall and produces clusters of pink to purplish pink flowers.

Range and habitat
Glandularia chiricahensis is native to Arizona, New Mexico, and Mexico. It is found in high mountains and is part of the plant community of the Madrean Sky Islands. It grows on rocky slopes, clearings in mixed woodlands, subalpine meadows, and disturbed areas. Research grade observations at iNaturalist range from 1000 m to 3000 m in elevation (October 2022).

References

Verbenaceae